Qasemabad-e Bozorg (also Romanized as Qāsemābād-e Bozorg) is a village in Saidabad Rural District of the Central District of Savojbolagh County, Alborz province, Iran. At the 2006 census, its population was 3,727 in 894 households. The latest census in 2016 counted 6,142 people in 1,700 households; it is the largest village in its rural district.

References 

Savojbolagh County

Populated places in Alborz Province

Populated places in Savojbolagh County